Spelterville is an unincorporated community in southwestern Otter Creek Township, Vigo County, in the U.S. state of Indiana.

It is part of the Terre Haute metropolitan area.

History
A post office was established at Spelterville in 1920, and remained in operation until it was discontinued in 1934. The community was named after the mineral spelter, which was once manufactured in the town.

Geography

References

Unincorporated communities in Indiana
Unincorporated communities in Vigo County, Indiana
Terre Haute metropolitan area